George Reynolds  was an Anglican priest, son of the Bishop of Lincoln, who served as Rector of Little Paxton and Archdeacon of Lincoln from 1725 to 1769.

References

Archdeacons of Lincoln